Damon Rivers Headden (1926 – 1958) was majority leader of the Tennessee House of Representatives from 1955 to 1957.

A Democrat, Headden represented a district from the northern part of West Tennessee.  One of his major interests was increasing the state's investment in its properties surrounding Reelfoot Lake, both as a conservation measure and as a way of stimulating economic development in what was a relatively impoverished area of the state.

Members of the Tennessee House of Representatives
1926 births
1958 deaths
20th-century American politicians